Right or Wrong is the debut album from pop singer Ronnie Dove.

History

The album's title shares that of his third Diamond Records single, originally country hit written and performed by Wanda Jackson.
The album also includes his first single on Diamond, "Sweeter Than Sugar", and its B-Side "I Believe in You".  The single debuted in April 1964, but failed to chart nationally. It did, however, chart on a few local surveys.  The two songs were written by Link Wray (using his father's name as a pseudonym).  The album also includes Dove's first Top 40 hit Say You, which reached #40 nationally, and reached #1 on Top 40 powerhouse CKLW.  

The album also features future single Hello Pretty Girl as its lead off track.

The original 1964 issue of the album was released in both mono and stereo.  The album has been reissued digitally by Ronnie Dove Music.

Cover Art 
Interestingly, the cover art of this album is almost an exact replica of Dion’s “Ruby Baby” album from the previous year, released by Columbia Records. Exactly why is unclear.

Track listing

References

1964 albums
Ronnie Dove albums